William Winston Seaton (January 11, 1785 – June 16, 1866) was an American journalist and the thirteenth Mayor of Washington, D.C.

Life
He was born in King William County, Virginia. From 1812 until 1860 he was, with his brother-in-law Joseph Gales, proprietor of the National Intelligencer at Washington, D.C. From 1812 until 1820 the two were the only reporters of congressional proceedings. Their Annals of Congress, Debates and Proceedings in the Congress of the United States from 3 March 1798, till 27 May 1824 (42 volumes, 1834–1856), and their Register of Debates in Congress from 1824 till 1837 (29 volumes, 1827–37) are sources of the utmost importance on the history of the times.

In 1809, he married Sarah Weston Gales (1790–1863), the daughter of newspaper publisher Joseph Gales Sr. and novelist Winifred Gales. Sarah spoke French and Spanish, and did occasional work for the National Intelligencer as a translator; they had 11 children.

Mayor of Washington D.C.

Seaton served on the Washington Board of Aldermen from 1819 to 1831, and was elected Mayor of Washington in 1840. However, Seaton was a Whig — the political party formed in opposition to the policies of the Democrats who then controlled both the Congress and the presidency. Federal officials were so distraught at Seaton's election that the Senate introduced legislation that would abolish the city's charter; thanks to petitions from District citizens and sympathetic Senators, the bill was tabled after three readings.

During his 10 years as mayor, Seaton was instrumental in the development of the city's public education system and in numerous civic improvements, including telegraph and gas lines as well as the construction of the first waterworks.

Founding of St. John's Episcopal Church, Lafayette Square

To supply this great need the residents in what was known as the First and Second Wards of Washington-lying between Georgetown and Sixth Street-in the year 1814 took decided measures to procure the erection of a church in the part of the city referred to. The persons who seem to have been most actively engaged in this work were Thomas H Gillis, James Davidson, Lund Washington, Peter Hagner, John Graham (diplomat), John Peter Van Ness, Joshua Dawson, William Winston Seaton, John Tayloe III, Thomas Munroe, James Thompson, James H. Blake, David Easton and Joseph Gales, Jr.

Societies

During the 1820s, Seaton was a member of the prestigious society, Columbian Institute for the Promotion of Arts and Sciences, who counted among their members former presidents Andrew Jackson and John Quincy Adams and many prominent men of the day, including well-known representatives of the military, government service, medical and other professions.

Later life
Seaton died in 1866 of skin cancer and was interred at Holmead's Burying Ground in Washington, D.C. He was later disinterred, and moved to an unmarked grave at Congressional Cemetery.

References

Sources
William Winston Seaton of the 'National Intelligencer'  By Josephine Seaton
Chest of Books

External links 
 

American male journalists
Mayors of Washington, D.C.
Burials at the Congressional Cemetery
1785 births
Seaton, William, Winston
People from King William County, Virginia
Burials at Holmead's Burying Ground
19th-century American politicians
Journalists from Virginia
Historians from Virginia